Chaullin Island (Helvecia Island) is an islet part of the Calbuco Archipelago and located between the  Putuqui Island and the West shore of the Reloncaví Sound with an approximate population of 12,500.

External links 

 Geonames.org Isla Chaullin

Calbuco Archipelago
Islands of Los Lagos Region